The Jaguar XK140 is a sports car manufactured by Jaguar between 1954 and 1957 as the successor to the XK120.   Upgrades included more interior space, improved brakes, rack and pinion steering, increased suspension travel, and telescopic shock absorbers instead of the older lever arm design.

History
The XK140 was introduced in late 1954 and sold as a 1955 model. Exterior changes that distinguished it from the XK120 included more substantial front and rear bumpers with overriders, and flashing turn signals (operated by a switch on the dash) above the front bumper.

The grille remained the same size but became a one-piece cast unit with fewer, and broader, vertical bars. The Jaguar badge was incorporated into the grille surround.  A chrome trim strip ran along the centre of the bonnet (hood) and boot (trunk) lid. An emblem on the boot lid contained the words "Winner Le Mans 1951–3".

The interior was made more comfortable for taller drivers by moving the engine, firewall and dash forward to give  more legroom. Two 6-volt batteries, one in each front wing were fitted to the Fixed Head Coupe, but Drop Heads and the Open Two Seater had a single 12-volt battery installed in the front wing on the passenger side.

The XK140 was powered by the William Heynes designed 3.4 litre Jaguar XK double overhead camshaft inline-6 engine, with the Special Equipment modifications from the XK120, which raised the specified power by 10 bhp to  gross at 5500 rpm, as standard. The optional C-Type cylinder head carried over from the XK120 catalogue, and produced  gross at 5750 rpm.

When fitted with the C-type head, 2-inch sand-cast H8 carburettors, heavier torsion bars and twin exhaust pipes, the car was designated XK140 SE in the UK and XK140 MC in North America.

In 1956 the XK140 became the first Jaguar sports car to be offered with automatic transmission. As with the XK120, wire wheels and dual exhausts were options, with most XK140s imported into the United States having the optional wheels. Cars with the standard disc wheels had spats (fender skirts) over the rear wheel opening. Factory spec 6.00 × 16 inch crossply tyres or optional 185VR16 Pirelli Cinturato CA67 radials could be fitted on either 16 × 5K½ solid wheels or 16 × 5K (special equipment) wire wheels.

Body styles
The Roadster (designated OTS – Open Two Seater – in America) had a light canvas top that folded out of sight behind the seats. The interior was trimmed in leather and leatherette, including the dash. Like the XK120 Roadster, the XK140 version had removable canvas and plastic side curtains on light alloy barchetta-type doors, and a tonneau cover. The door tops and scuttle panel were cut back by two inches (50mm) compared to the XK120, to allow a more modern positioning of the steering wheel. The angle of the front face of the doors (A-Post) was changed from 45 degrees to 90 degrees, to make access easier. The windscreen remained removable.

The Drophead Coupé (DHC) had a bulkier lined canvas top that lowered onto the body behind the seats, a fixed windscreen integral with the body, wind-up side windows, and a small rear seat. It also had a walnut-veneered dashboard and door cappings.

The Fixed Head Coupé (FHC) shared the DHC's interior trim and rear seat. The prototype Fixed Head Coupe retained the XK120 Fixed Head roof-profile, with the front wings and doors the same as the Drophead. Production cars had the roof lengthened, windscreen placed further forward, shorter front wings, and longer doors, all resulting in easier entry and more interior space and legroom.

Engine specifications

Performance
A stock XK-140 SE could achieve a top speed of 120–125 mph (193–201 km/h). Karl Ludvigsen's test published in Sports Car World (July 1957) had the same results as the SCI test.

Acceleration times from 0– were 8.4 seconds, 9.1 seconds and 9.1 seconds respectively. Only the R&T test tried 0– which took 26.5 seconds. Standing 1/4 mile (~400 m) times were 16.6 seconds ( approx) and 16.9 seconds.

Coachbuilt versions 
The Jaguar XK140 Zagato Coupé was built for Guido Modiano (a personal friend of Elio and Ugo Zagato) whose XK140 was damaged in an accident. Zagato displayed the car at the 1957 Paris Motor Show, hoping to sell more. Two more were built, although they were XK150s.The Jaguar XK140 Coupé by Ghia was designed by Giovanni Michelotti in 1955. Three cars have reportedly been built.

Production 
Chassis numbers as supplied by Jaguar Heritage Trust

References

External links

 XKData.com volunteer maintained online registry with thousands of cars

XK140
Rear-wheel-drive vehicles
24 Hours of Le Mans race cars
Cars introduced in 1954
Coupés
Roadsters